Aquinas Academy is a private, Roman Catholic K - 12 school in Gibsonia, Pennsylvania.  It is located in the Roman Catholic Diocese of Pittsburgh, and consistently ranks in the top 5 schools in western Pennsylvania in its average SAT scores, in some years ranking first. The school also has consistently been named one of the Top Fifty Catholic Secondary Schools in the annual High School Honor Roll published by the Acton Institute . The high school was ranked the number one Catholic High School in Pennsylvania in 2015 and 2016 by Niche.com and has been ranked the number one Catholic High School in the Pittsburgh area from 2015-2021 by Niche.com.

Background

The Academy was founded in 1996 for the purpose of offering a rigorous classical curriculum covering all the major areas of the liberal arts in an intensive college preparatory program. It is the only independent K-12 Catholic school in the Pittsburgh area.

Notes and references

External links
 School website

Catholic secondary schools in Pennsylvania
Educational institutions established in 1996
Schools in Allegheny County, Pennsylvania
Private middle schools in Pennsylvania
Private elementary schools in Pennsylvania
1996 establishments in Pennsylvania